Paolo Zini (born 25 May 1948) is an Italian racing cyclist. He rode in the 1970 Tour de France.

References

External links
 

1948 births
Living people
Italian male cyclists
Sportspeople from Parma
Cyclists from Emilia-Romagna